Second-seeded Christine Truman defeated Zsuzsi Körmöczy 6–4, 7–5 in the final to win the women's singles tennis title at the 1959 French Championships.

Seeds
The seeded players are listed below. Christine Truman is the champion; others show the round in which they were eliminated.

  Zsuzsi Körmöczy (finalist)
  Christine Truman (champion)
  Maria Bueno (quarterfinals)
  Shirley Brasher (third round)
  Mary Reitano (quarterfinals)
  Sandra Reynolds (semifinals)
  Jeanne Marie Arth (second round)
  Yola Ramírez (third round)
  Vera Puzejova (quarterfinals)
  Christiane Mercelis (second round)
  Janet Hopps (third round)
  Florence De La Courtie (third round)
  Rosie Reyes (semifinals)
  Silvana Lazzarino (third round)
  Renée Schuurman (second round)
  Mimi Arnold (third round)

Draw

Key
 Q = Qualifier
 WC = Wild card
 LL = Lucky loser
 r = Retired

Finals

Earlier rounds

Section 1

Section 2

Section 3

Section 4

References

External links
   on the French Open website

1959 in women's tennis
1959
1959 in French women's sport
1959 in French tennis